Brennan Menell (born May 24, 1997) is an American professional ice hockey defenseman currently playing under contract with HC Dynamo Moscow of the Kontinental Hockey League (KHL).

Playing career
Undrafted, Menell played for the Vancouver Giants and Lethbridge Hurricanes in the Western Hockey League before signing as a free agent with the Minnesota Wild on a three-year, entry-level contract after impressing on an invitation to attend training camp on September 26, 2017, having been undrafted in the NHL Entry Draft.

In his final year of his entry-level contract with the Wild, Menell was reassigned to AHL affiliate, the Iowa Wild, for the third consecutive year. In the 2019–20 season, Menell established a career high with 47 points in 57 games for Iowa, finishing second among AHL defensemen in scoring and first in assists with 42. As Iowa's franchise record-holder in nearly all offensive categories for blueliners, with 101 assists and 116 points in 199 games over his AHL career, Menell was selected to the AHL First All-Star Team. During the season, he was recalled by the Wild and made his NHL debut against the Anaheim Ducks on December 10, 2019. He featured in 5 games with the Wild, going scoreless.

As an impending restricted free agent with the Minnesota Wild and with the uncertainty of a delayed commencement of the 2020–21 North American season, Menell opted to sign abroad by signing a one-year contract with Belarusian club, HC Dinamo Minsk of the Kontinental Hockey League (KHL), on August 29, 2020.

On July 28, 2021, his signing rights were acquired by the Toronto Maple Leafs from the Minnesota Wild for a 7th round draft pick in the 2022 NHL Entry Draft. He was then signed a one-year, two-way, $750,000 contract with Toronto on August 1, 2021. On March 23, 2022, a day after the trade deadline, he was traded to the Philadelphia Flyers in exchange for future considerations. He completed the season playing with the Flyers AHL affiliate, the Lehigh Valley Phantoms, collecting 6 assists through 18 games.

As a free agent from the Flyers, Menell opted to return to the KHL after securing a one-year contract with Russian club, HC Dynamo Moscow, for the 2022–23 season on September 19, 2022.

Career statistics

Awards and honors

References

External links

1997 births
Living people
American men's ice hockey defensemen
HC Dinamo Minsk players
HC Dynamo Moscow players
Iowa Wild players
Lehigh Valley Phantoms players
Lethbridge Hurricanes players
Minnesota Wild players
People from Woodbury, Minnesota
Ice hockey players from Minnesota
Toronto Marlies players
Undrafted National Hockey League players
Vancouver Giants players